Zoila Aurora Cáceres Moreno (1877–1958) was a writer associated with the literary movement known as modernismo. This European-based daughter of a Peruvian president wrote novels, essays, travel literature and a biography of her husband, the Guatemalan novelist Enrique Gómez Carrillo.

Her life itself is intimately intertwined with Peruvian history, the War of the Pacific (1879–1883), the Peruvian Civil War of 1895, and an intellectual's exile in Paris. Her essays have recently begun to receive critical attention by scholars attempting to understand modernism from a gendered perspective.
During the War of the Pacific, her sister was killed while her family was fleeing from the Chileans. Her father Andrés Avelino Cáceres, at that time a Colonel in the Peruvian Army, was mounting a guerrilla war against the occupying army. Peru (and Bolivia) lost that war and the Chileans occupied Lima, the country's capital. After the Chileans departed, now General Cáceres served in a variety of functions, as a diplomat in Europe, president of the Republic, and then exiled after a bloody coup in 1895. All of these events affected Zoila Aurora Cáceres, who was educated by nuns in Germany and at the Sorbone in Paris. She was known to many of the major modernista authors including Amado Nervo, Ruben Darío and Enrique Gómez Carrillo, whom she married.

Besides her interesting life, she left behind political tracks and a wide gamut of writing. Regarding the former, César Lévano points out the following: she founded Feminine Evolution in 1911, in 1919 she organized a feminine strike for food, while in 1924 she organized a new organization, "Peruvian Femenism". She was a die-hard suffragist associated with Angela Ramos. Later she would work with the anti-fascist organization "Feminine Action".

Regarding the latter, Aurora Cáceres has left behind a varied and diverse output. Her compelling novel La rosa muerta, recently published by Stockcero for the first time in almost a century, was set in Paris where it was published in 1914. In a work sharing formal characteristics with modernista prose, Cáceres challenged the ideological parameters of the movement. While her protagonist appropriated the modernista precept of a woman as an object of male veneration, she also took active control of her sexual life in a world where husbands still treated their wives as objects. The objects in this novel are not people but implements of communication and medicine reflective of the apogee of the industrial age. The action, which takes place between Berlin and Paris, is representative of the places that the modernistas held dear, but the feminization of the portrayal of male-female relations broadens the scope of the  male-dominated modernista literary paradigm. The ideal men in this novel are not the husbands from whom women run, but medical doctors, men of science who are liberated from chauvinist attitudes. The central character of “La rosa muerta” accordingly falls for one of her gynecologists, allowing for scenes in the Paris clinic that must have been scandalous for the 1914 reading public.

Her Writing

 Angelina, Eva. “La emancipación de la mujer”. El Búcaro Americano 1.6/1.7 (15 de mayo; 1 de junio de 1896): 117-118, 127–30.
 Cáceres, Zoila Aurora. Mujeres de ayer y de hoy. París: Garnier Hermanos, 1910.
 ——.Oasis de arte. Prólogo de Rubén Darío. París: Garnier Hermanos, ¿1910? ¿1911?
 Cáceres, Aurora. La rosa muerta/Las perlas de Rosa. Prólogo de Amado Nervo. Paris: Garnier Hermanos, 1914.
 Cáceres, Zoila Aurora & Andrés Avelino Cáceres. La campaña de la Breña, memorias del mariscal del Perú, D. Andrés A. Cáceres. Lima, Imp. Americana, 1921.
 Cáceres, Z. Aurora (Evangelina). La ciudad del sol. Prólogo de Enrique Gómez Carrillo. Lima: Librería Francesa Científica/Casa Editorial F. Rosay, 1927.
 Cáceres, [Zoila] Aurora (Evangelina). Mi vida con Enrique Gómez Carrillo. Madrid: Renacimiento, 1929.
 Cáceres, Zoila Aurora. La princesa Suma Tica (narraciones peruanas). Madrid: Editorial Mundo Latino, 1929.
——. Labor de armonía interamericana en los Estados Unidos de Norte América, 1940–1945. Washington, 1946.
 ——. Epistolario relativo a Miguel de Unamuno. En Unamuno y el Perú. Ed. Wilfredo Kapsoli. Lima/Salamanca: Universidad Ricardo Palma/ Universidad de Salamanca, 2002: 27–31.
 Cáceres, Aurora. A Dead Rose. Trans. Laura Kanost. Stockcero, 2018.

On Her and Her Time
 Arriola Grande, Maurilio. Diccionario literario del Perú: Nomenclatura por autores. Dos tomes. Lima: Editora Universo, 1983.
 Frederick, Bonnie. “Harriet Beecher Stowe and the Virtuous Mother: Argentina, 1852–1910”. Journal of Women's History 18.1 (2006): 101-120.
 Glickman, Robert Jay. Vestales del Templo azul: notas sobre el feminismo hispanoamericano en la época modernista. Toronto: Canadian Academy of the Arts, 1996.
 Herrera, Eduardo. “Una visita a Evangelina”. En La ciudad del sol de Aurora Cáceres. Lima: Librería Francesa Científica/Casa Editorial E. Rosay, 1927: 185–193.
 Kanost, Laura. "Translator's Introduction". A Dead Rose by Aurora Cáceres. Trans. Laura Kanost. Stockcero, 2018: vii-xxv.
 Levano, César. [https://web.archive.org/web/20070705033829/http://www.caretas.com.pe/1999/1575/mujeres/mujeres.htm "Las mujeres y el poder] Caretas (1999).
 Minardi, Giovanna. “La narrativa femenina en el Perú del siglo XX”. Alba de América 37/38 (2001): 177–196.
 Rojas–Trempe, Lady. “Escritoras peruanas al alba del próximo milenio”. En Perú en su cultura. Eds. Daniel Castillo Durante y Borka Sattler. Lima/Ottawa: PromPerú/University of Ottawa; 2002: 175–181.
 Rojas-Trempe, Lady. "Mujeres y movimientos sociales en América Latina: Angela Ramos y Magda Portal, escritoras políticas de pie en la historia del Perú". Debate: Literatura y género (2004).
 Ward, Thomas. "Los caminos posibles de Nietzsche en el modernismo", Nueva Revista de Filología Hispánica'' 50.2 (julio-diciembre de 2002): 480-515.
 Ward, Thomas. "Introducción". La Rosa Muerta. Buenos Aires: Stockcero, 2007: vii-xxiv. 

1877 births
1958 deaths
Peruvian essayists
Modernismo
Peruvian feminists
Peruvian women activists
Feminist writers
Peruvian women novelists
19th-century novelists
Peruvian women essayists
19th-century women writers
19th-century essayists
Peruvian suffragists